Poonam Dubey (born 8 February 1990)  is an Indian actress working in Bhojpuri cinema. She resides in Allahabad in Uttar Pradesh.

She has worked in many films like Jo Jeeta Wahi Sikandar, Jaanam, Inteqam, Rangdari Tax, Chana Jor Garam and many more.

Awards

Filmography

See also
 List of Bhojpuri cinema actresses

References

External links 
 Official website
 

Indian film actresses
Actresses in Bhojpuri cinema
21st-century Indian actresses
Living people
1990 births